The Men's Tournament of the 2017 FIBA 3x3 Europe Cup took place at the Museumplein in Amsterdam, the Netherlands. Twelve teams participated in the men's tournament.

Participating teams 
Netherlands, as host country, and eleven more teams qualified to the final tournament through the two qualifiers played in Andorra and France.

Players

Pool play

Pool A

Pool B

Pool C

Pool D

Knockout stage

Source: FIBA

Final standings

References

External links
Official website

2017